Lecsó (Czech and Slovak: lečo; ; ; Russian and ) is a Hungarian thick vegetable ragout or stew which traditionally contains yellow pointed peppers, tomato, onion, salt, and ground sweet and/or hot paprika as a base recipe. The onions and peppers are usually sauteed in lard, bacon fat, or sunflower oil. Garlic can also be a traditional ingredient. It is also considered to be traditional food in Czech, Slovak and former Yugoslavian cuisine and is also very common in Poland, Austria, and Israel.

Most Hungarian recipes recommend the mildest variant of Hungarian wax pepper, which are in season August–October which is also when field tomatoes are at their best. Other recipes suggest using both bell pepper and banana pepper as alternatives.

Varieties
 
There is a large variety of lecsós, the base of all being a mixture of tomatoes and peppers (both sweet and hot), onions, spiced with salt, sometimes red paprika powder and often garlic. Some recipes may also use bay leaf, ground black pepper or thyme, but those are not original ones. To make the perfect lecsó base, one must render the lard from the smoked bacon (if that is used instead of oil, which is also common), and fry the onion slices until the edges become slightly brownish. Next the pepper slices must be added and fried until crisp. The tomatoes come last because, if added at the beginning, they would soak the onions and the peppers.

Lecsó may be made with cooked rice or scrambled eggs. To  serve a warm dish - for example fried fish - with sour cream or in a pancake, as a filling is also common. Most of the recipes are with sausage (called "kolbász" such as lecsókolbász, made specifically for this purpose, or Debrecener sausage) bacon or frankfurter. Some are decorated with slices of hard-boiled egg or thickened with beaten eggs. If meat is added, it may be added first, and fried with the onions and pepper slices.

Lecsó, like its French semi-counterpart ratatouille, often stands alone as a lunch dish, in which case it is often consumed with bread. Plain lecsó can be served as a side dish accompanying various main dishes, for example roasted chicken, pheasant, pork, beef or Eszterhazy steak.
It is widely believed in Hungary that the best lecsó is made over an open fire in a "bogrács" (a cauldron), a Hungarian style barbecue. In Hungary the dish is very popular, and even has its own festivals.

In Germany, lecsó is referred to as Letscho and often used as the primary ingredient of a sauce that is used with many different meals. It is usually made of tomatoes, peppers, and onions among other regional additions.

In Poland, lecsó (called leczo) is usually made from red pepper, zucchini, tomatoes, onion and garlic, sausage, and spiced with powdered chilli pepper. Leczo should be served hot and spicy. It probably came to Poland from Hungary.

See also
 Ajvar, a Serbian and Croatian spread made of red peppers
 Sataraš, a similar dish that is popular in the Balkans
 Peperonata, a similar dish from southern Italy
 List of stews
 Galayet bandora, a similar Jordanian dish
 Matbucha, a similar dish from the Maghreb.

References

Hungarian stews
Lunch dishes
National dishes